North Shore, Nova Scotia may refer to:

North Shore (Nova Scotia), an economic region
North Shore, Cumberland, Nova Scotia
North Shore, an unincorporated area in the Municipality of the County of Victoria